Achsah (Hebrew: עַכְסָה, also Acsah), was Caleb ben Yefune's only daughter. The meaning of her name is courageous. In Biblical Names the meaning of the name Achsah is: Adorned, bursting the veil.

She was offered in marriage to the man who would lead an attack on the city of Debir, also called Kirjath-sepher/Kirjath-sannah. This was done by Othniel, Caleb's brother's son, who accordingly obtained her as his wife.

Achsah later requested, and was given, upper and lower springs of water (presumably in the Negev) from her father.

Various Septuagint manuscripts, in various passages, give her name as Ascha, Achsa, Aza, and Oxa.

References

Tribe of Judah
Book of Joshua
Book of Judges people
Books of Chronicles people
Women in the Hebrew Bible